Potuluri Veerabrahmendhra swami varu (popularly known as Brahmam garu), was an Indian Hindu saint, who lived in gadapa (now- use kadapa) Andhra Pradesh region. He is most notable in Andhra for his work Kalagnanam, a book of predictions written in Telugu somewhere around 16th century. It forecasts many incidents which are proved to be correct by the posterity.   His prophetic texts in Kalagnanam are the Govinda Vakyas and Jeevaikya Bodha.

Legendary account 
 
According to a legend, Veerabrahmam was born to a religious couple, Paripurnayacharya and Prakruthamba, near the river Sarasvati River in the village of Brahmandapuram. The couple abandoned Swamy at birth and Veerambrahmam was brought up at Atri Mahamuni Ashram near Kashi (present-day Varanasi). Later Veerabhojayacharya, Head of the Papagni Mutt, Chikballapur, Karnataka, was on a pilgrimage with his wife. The couple visited the Sage Atri Ashram, and Sage Atri gave the child to the couple. They received the child as a divine gift and returned to Papagni Mutt. The child was named 'Veeram Bhotlaiah'.
 
Veerabrahmendra Swamy, then known as the Veeram Bhotlaiah at Papagni Mutt authored the Kalikamba Sapthashathi (the manuscript written in praise of goddess Kali) at the age of 11. A few days later, Veerabhojayacharya made a sacrifice and Veeram Bhotlaiah told his stepmother that he had refused to take homage responsibilities  and started his spiritual journey. His first disciple was Dudekula Siddaiah. People started listening to Veeram Bhotlaiah's chanting and philosophical poems, and as a sign of respect they called him 'Sri Madvirat Pothuluri Veera Brahmendra Swami'. 

Veerabrahmendra Swamy attained Jiva Samadhi at Brahmam gari Matam, Kadapa District on Kartika Shudda Dwadasi.

Legacy
 Brahmamgari matam in Kadapa district is a pilgrimage center in Andhra Pradesh. 
 Editor T Ganapati Sastri of the book BrahmaTatwa Prakasika of Sadasivendra Saraswati (Trivandrum Sanskrit Series No VII), published in 1909, makes passing mention of a Tamil work called Acharya-Darpana that supposedly details a wide description of his deeds.
 Srimadvirat Veerabrahmendra Swami Charitra is a 1984 film on his life. Late Chief Minister of Andhra Pradesh N. T. Rama Rao acted and directed. The film became a hit in Andhra Pradesh.

References

External links
Kalagnanam (Telugu)
Jeevaikya Bodha (Telugu)
Govinda Vakyas (Telugu)

17th-century Indian people
Indian Hindu saints
People from Kadapa district